Samuel Hildreth Hubbard, Jr. was the head coach for the William & Mary Tribe men's basketball team for the 1916–1917 season. He produced a 4–9 record during that time. Hubbard was also the head football coach for the 1916 season, going 2–5–2.

Head coaching record

Football

Basketball

References

Year of birth missing
Year of death missing
American men's basketball coaches
William & Mary Tribe athletic directors
William & Mary Tribe baseball coaches
William & Mary Tribe men's basketball coaches
William & Mary Tribe football coaches